The pyramid of Ameny Qemau is an ancient Egyptian pyramid located in southern Dahshur. It was constructed for Ameny Qemau, a obscure king of the 13th Dynasty during the Second Intermediate Period.

Pyramid
The stone constituting its upper structure has been entirely robbed but the damaged substructures remain. The pyramid was discovered by Charles Arthur Musès in  1957 and excavated in 1968. The burial chamber comprised from a single colossal block of quartzite similar to that of Amenemhat III, with receptacles for the sarcophagus and the canopic jars hewn out of the interior of the block.

Discovery and excavations
The earliest known historical mention of the pyramid of Ameny Qemau is found in the book of the medieval Arab historian Taqi al-Din Ahmad Al-Maqrizi "Geography and History of Egypt" where Al-Maqrizi describes the "pyramids of Dashur". 

The pyramid of Ameny Qemau was rediscovered in 1957 by a team led by Charles Arthur Musès. In 1968, Vito Maragioglio and Celeste Rinaldi investigated the architecture of the pyramid.
More recently, the remains of the funerary equipment of the king were published by Nabil Swelim and Aidan Dodson.

See also

Egyptian pyramid construction techniques
List of Egyptian pyramids
Lepsius list of pyramids

References

Dahshur
Pyramids of the Thirteenth Dynasty of Egypt